Baraldi is a surname. Notable people with the surname include:

 Angela Baraldi (born 1964), Italian actress and rock singer
 Barbara Baraldi, Italian mystery and fantasy writer
 Fabio Baraldi (born 1990), Italian water polo player
 Gianfranco Baraldi (born 1935), Italian Olympic runner
 Lorenzo Baraldi (born 1940), Italian production designer and costume designer
 Pietro Neri-Baraldi (1828–1902), Italian opera singer